A picture is an artifact that depicts or records visual perception.

Picture(s) may also refer to:

Mathematics and science
 Picture (mathematics), a combinatorial structure
 Picture (string theory), a representation of states
 PICTURE clause, a COBOL data type

Music
 Picture (band), a Dutch heavy metal band

Albums
 Picture (album), a 2005 album by Kino
 Pictures (Atlanta album), 1984
 Pictures (Jack DeJohnette album), 1976
 Pictures (John Michael Montgomery album), 2002
 Pictures (Katie Melua album), 2007
 Pictures (Leon Bolier album), 2008
 Pictures (Niels-Henning Ørsted Pedersen and Kenneth Knudsen album), 1977
 Pictures (Timo Maas album), 2005
 Pictures, a 2006 album by Tony Rich

Songs
 "Picture" (song), a 2001 song by Kid Rock and Sheryl Crow
 "Pictures" (song), a 2006 song by Sneaky Sound System
 "Pictures", a song by Sia from Lady Croissant
 "Pictures", a song by AM Conspiracy from AM Conspiracy
 "Pictures", a song by Mojave 3 from Ask Me Tomorrow
 "Pictures", a song by System of a Down from Steal This Album!
 "Pictures", a song by Terry McDermott
 "Pictures", a song by Tommy Keene from Based on Happy Times

Other media
 Film or motion picture
 Movie theater, a building in which films are shown
 Pictures (film), a 1981 New Zealand film
 "Pictures" (short story), a 1917 short story by Katherine Mansfield
 Picture, a 1952 book by Lillian Ross

See also
 The Picture (disambiguation)
 Image (disambiguation)
 
 
 Pictura: An Adventure in Art, a documentary film